This article lists events from the year 2017 in Burundi.

Incumbents
President: Pierre Nkurunziza
 First Vice President - Gaston Sindimwo
 Second Vice President - Joseph Butore

Events
1 January - Environmental minister, Emmanuel Niyonkuru, is gunned down in Bujumbura.

Deaths
1 January – Emmanuel Niyonkuru, politician, assassinated (b. 1962).

References

Links

 
2010s in Burundi
Years of the 21st century in Burundi
Burundi
Burundi